Chimoré may refer to:
Chimoré River, Bolivia
Chimoré Municipality, Cochabamba, Bolivia
Chimoré, Cochabamba, the seat of the municipality
Chimore Airport
Chimoré, Santa Cruz, Bolivia